Blavity is an American Internet media company and website based in Los Angeles, created by and for black millennials. Their mission is to "economically and creatively support Black millennials across the African scape, so they can pursue the work they love, and change the world in the process."

Founding 
Blavity was founded by Morgan DeBaun (CEO) and co-founded by Jonathan Jackson, Jeff Nelson and Aaron Samuels in 2014; DeBaun had worked at Intuit for three years prior but left to found the new company. Blavity's name is a combination of the words "black" and "gravity", inspired by DeBaun's experience as an undergraduate at Washington University; she was struck that eating lunch with a few friends at their regular table in the college cafeteria over time attracted more and more black students to their discussions of everything from politics to pop culture, a kind of intellectual "black gravity".

Content, visitors and growth 
In Essence, Lihle Z. Mtshali described the site as focused "on sub-cultures, community, and local happenings in different cities rather than covering celebrities and mainstream black culture." The site contains approximately 40% user-generated content.

In September 2016, Blavity reached millions of unique visitors per month. That month, the company closed a one million dollar round of seed funding. Investor and mentor was Monique Woodard, a famous African-American businesswoman.

In 2016, Blavity launched two conferences: EmpowerHer, a conference in New York City for black women, and Afrotech, a San Francisco summit for black people in technology.

In 2017, Blavity launched a black women's lifestyle platform, 21Ninety, and acquired two other properties, the black entertainment website Shadow and Act and the black travel website Travel Noire.

In July 2018, Blavity raised $6.5 million in new funding through GV, Comcast Ventures, Plexo Capital, and Baron Davis Enterprises. The funds are intended to increase the size of the company's engineering group, which works on new content, and establish a new office in Atlanta.

In January 2023, Blavity launched Home and Texture. The new media brand is dedicated to serving multicultural audiences buying homes, designing their spaces and starting families.

Recognition 
In 2016, two of the Blavity founders, DeBaun and Samuels, were named to the Forbes 30 Under 30 list of "young people transforming the future of America".

DeBaun is a recipient of ADCOLOR’s Innovative Award, America’s Top 50 Women in Tech lists, and was named as one of the 100 Most Influential African Americans by The Root.

References

Further reading

2019, Sluis, Sarah https://www.adexchanger.com/the-sell-sider/diverse-and-diversified-blavity-ceo-on-building-a-media-company-for-black-millennials/ AdExchanger

2021,https://www.cnn.com/2021/06/11/perspectives/black-wall-street-entrepreneurs-business-leaders/index.html CNN

2022, Ambachew, Meseret | url-https://www.adweek.com/programmatic/how-this-ssp-helped-blavity-and-black-enterprise-grow-ad-revenue/?utm_content=buffer0c439&utm_medium=social&utm_source=twitter.com&utm_campaign=buffer. Adweek

2022, Guaglione, Sara |https://digiday.com/media/tastemade-teams-up-with-blavity-to-create-video-vertical-centered-on-black-food-culture/?utm_campaign=digidaydis&utm_source=twitter&utm_medium=social&utm_content=82622. Digiday

External links

African-American mass media
Internet properties established in 2014